Sarah Maria Griffin (born 28 Jan. 1988) is an Irish writer, poet and producer of zines. She is the author of a volume each of poetry and essays, and three novels.

Life

Early life and education
Born 25 January 1988, Griffin grew up between two Northside suburbs of Dublin, Kilbarrack and Raheny; one grandmother lived near the family home and she visited frequently while growing up; her grandmother was very involved in community drama. She attended secondary school at Manor House School, Raheny.  Griffin earned a degree in English, Media and Cultural Studies from Dún Laoghaire Institute of Art, Design and Technology and a Masters in Creative Writing from NUI Galway.   

After a year teaching in Neilstown, greater Clondalkin, Griffin moved to San Francisco in 2012, accompanying her boyfriend, who had been offered a transfer with Facebook. Griffin had a ring made and asked her boyfriend to marry her in 2013, and the wedding took place in San Francisco City Hall. Over three years of life in California, she worked at a number of jobs, including as a receptionist, a copywriter, a nanny, for a start-up, and in a bookshop. She commented that life in San Francisco was interesting but not easy, and that while aware of the Irish diaspora there, she did not engage with it. 

Returning to Ireland in 2015, she worked at writing full-time.

Writing career and approach
Reading intensely, and writing from childhood, Griffin was in part inspired by zines she encountered in small shops like Dublin's Secret Book and Record Store and a "distro" outlet in Temple Bar. Submitting material to publications from the teen years, Griffin started her professional career writing poetry.  Her first book was a collection, Follies (Belfast: Lapwing, 2011), primarily of poems, with a few short prose pieces, which was launched by Professor Adrian Frazier in Galway.  In the same period, mid-2011, a play by Griffin, Sleep skips my heart was performed in a short run at the Town Hall Theatre in Galway.

She expanded into writing articles for newspapers and other media outlets, including BuzzFeed and The Guardian, and the online current affairs and investigative journal, the Dublin Inquirer; her non-fiction has also appeared in works including Guts, The Stinging Fly, The Rumpus and Winter Pages.  

She was invited to co-edit the Bare Hands online poetry magazine by its founder, fellow poet Kellie O'Brien, and they issued monthly runs of the journal.  They also successfully fund-raised to publish, in late 2012, a print collection of Bare Hands poetry and photography, with works by more than 25 poets and 15 photographers.  The book had three launch events, in Dublin, Cork and Galway.  

Griffin, newly settled in San Francisco, started to produce her own zines. Further, with some background in long-form essays, and with several pieces about the emigrant experience in California, Griffin secured Vanessa O'Loughlin as an agent, and a deal for a non-fiction collection was secured. This, her second book, Not Lost: A Story About Leaving Home, was published by New Island in Dublin in 2013, and comprises articles written in San Francisco, primarily on aspects of emigrant life during her first year there.  

Griffin's third book and first novel, Spare and Found Parts, for the young adult market, was released in 2016 (Greenwillow) in the US and other markets, and in 2018 (Titan) in Ireland and the UK. In a 2018 interview she mentioned having worked intensely from home during 2017 after an injury, and then working primarily from a desk in the main reading room of the National Library of Ireland; she also spent a year with the LexIcon library in Dun Laoghaire as her main base, and enjoys writing on Valentia Island. A fourth book, Other Words for Smoke, also for the young adult market, was issued in 2019 (Greenwillow and Titan).  ALso in 2019, the writer resumed producing zines, under the Wordfury brand. Griffin has spoken of working on a third novel on several occasions.

Works and reception
Griffin's first novel, Spare and Found Parts, is a young adult dystopian science fiction work. It is set in the aftermath of a machine apocalypse called "the Turn", in "Black Water City", a remnant of Dublin, so named from one of the two Irish-language names for the city, in turn derived from the River Poddle.  In an Ireland where only a tiny fraction of the pre-apocalyptic population survives, without information technology, there is a division of survivors between urban "Pale" and rural "Pasture". The protaganist, Nell Crane, is the daughter of two key figures in the city, the life of which partly revolves around sourcing and fittng of body parts. The novel was reviewed widely, including by the Irish Times, and nominated for prizes. The novel has LGBTQIA+ elements, woven in without emphasis, as noted by leading review journal, Kirkus, which concluded that the book is a "page-turning whole".

Her second novel, Other Words for Smoke, is a young adult novel of the fantastic, which won Teen and YA Book of the Year at the Irish Book Awards in 2019. It is set in a fictional location near Dublin, with witches and a house which is more than it appears. The book was reviewed positively by Locus Magazine. The book has lesbian characters in key roles.

Griffin's third novel, The Book of Wisdom was commissioned for Tomorrowland, one of the largest music festivals in the world, with around 200,000 copies of the book distributed to those booking festival tickets, along with their access bracelets. It features two young protagonists, from Raheny and San Francisco, and a library.

Griffin has mentioned Maeve Binchy as a major influence, on her work with dialogue and character, and pace.

Spoken word
From 2009, Griffin started to appear on the Irish spoken word scene, taking part in BrownBread Mixtape, The Glor Sessions and Exchange Words (in which she won a fiction "slam"), as well as launching a diary-readout event, Scarlet Fer Yer Mah Fer Havin Yah (the name is in Dublin inner city mode).  In 2011, Culture Ireland took her to New York to perform in spoken word events there.

As of 2019, Griffin was writing a podcast for The Irish Times.  As of 2023, Griffin was also one of the presenters of an ongoing podcast series, Juvenalia.

In 2023, she released a talk on her work with zines with the Museum of Literature Ireland.

Recognition and residences
Griffin won the 2017 European Science Fiction Awards Chrysalis Award.  Her 2019 young adult novel, Other Words for Smoke, was included on the 2020 American Library Association Rainbow List, and won the Teen and YA category at the 2019 Irish Book Awards.

She was awarded Arts Council bursary in 2017—2018 and 2020—2022.

Griffin was the Writer-In-Residence at Maynooth University for the 2017 to 2018 academic year, where she conducted classes with students and provided workshops, talks and other events, including in county libraries. She was Dun Laoghaire-Rathdown (DLR) writer-in-residence for 2018-2019, and during that year she was one of the speakers at the official State commemoration of the sinking of the RMS Leinster.

Bibliography

Books
Follies (as author; Belfast: Lapwing, 2011), collection of poetry and "flash prose"
Not Lost: A Story About Leaving Home (as author; Dublin: New Island, 2013, also on Kindle), essay collection
Spare and Found Parts (as author; New York: Greenwillow Books (HarperCollins), 2016, / / London: Titan Books, 2018, novel
Other Words for Smoke (as author; New York: Greenwillow, April 2019 and London: Titan Books, 2019, /), novel
The Book of Wisdom (as author; Boom, Belgium: Tomorrowland and New York: Melcher Media, 2019, novel, issued to c. 200,000 festival subscribers)

Edited or contributed
Bare Hands Anthology (as co-editor; Dublin and San Francisco: Bare Hands, 2012), a print collection from an online poetry journal with photography
Red lamp, black piano: a Cáca Milis Cabaret anthology (as contributor; Dublin: Tara Press, 2013)
Titan Tasters: 10 Tempting Morsels from 2019-2020 (as contributor; London: Titan Books, 2019, special for Worldcon 2019)
Deep Routes Poetry Exchange (as poet / contributor; Wexford: Ardara Press, 2021)

Personal life
As of 2018, Griffin was living near the sea in her mother's home area, Ringsend, and as of 2019, she was married to Ceri Bevan.

References and sources

External links

People from Raheny
Kilbarrack
People educated at Manor House School, Raheny
Writers from Dublin (city)
21st-century Irish writers
Alumni of IADT
Alumni of the University of Galway
Irish women poets
Irish women novelists
Living people